Arnold Sziklay (flourished circa 1896) was the first Hungarian filmmaker.

External links

Hungarian film directors
Year of death missing
Year of birth missing